"Ett liv med dej" is a power ballad written by Ingela 'Pling' Forsman, Bobby Ljunggren and Håkan Almqvist, and performed by Towe Jaarnek at Melodifestivalen 1991, where it finished second.

The single peaked at number 35 on the Swedish singles chart. The song also stayed at Svensktoppen for 10 weeks between 21 April-25 August 1991, peaking at number three.

Charts

References

1991 songs
1991 singles
Songs with lyrics by Ingela Forsman
Songs written by Bobby Ljunggren
Swedish-language songs
Melodifestivalen songs of 1991